Kid Chameleon is a 1992 platform game developed and published by Sega released for the Sega Genesis. In the game, a boss character with artificial intelligence in a virtual reality video game begins abducting players and the main protagonist Casey goes in to beat the game and rescue them. He does this by using masks to shapeshift into different characters in order to use different abilities. After its initial release in 1992 for the Genesis, it was later re-released a number of times in the 2000s, including part of the Sega Smash Pack 2 for the PC in 2000, the Sega Genesis Collection for the PlayStation Portable and PlayStation 2 in 2006, as a digital release on the Wii's Virtual Console in 2007, Sonic's Ultimate Genesis Collection for Xbox 360 and PlayStation 3 in 2009 and for the Sega Forever service in 2017.

Gameplay
The player, as Kid Chameleon, progresses through a series of levels, containing an array of deadly enemies and obstacles. Most levels contain a flag, which is the primary goal of each level, from which the player progresses to the next level. However, a number of teleporters throughout the game can warp the player not only to different places in the same level, but also to different levels, and sometimes to an entirely different path through the game. At the end of the game, Kid fights and defeats the final boss, Heady Metal. Kid Chameleon contains 103 levels, of which only about half are on the "main path" (traversing levels only by flags). Thirty-two of these 103 levels are smaller, unnamed levels simply called "Elsewhere". Despite the game's considerable length, there is no password system or other method of saving the game (although re-releases in compilations and the Virtual Console include their own save features). There are several bonuses that can be earned at the end of certain levels (in which the flag is touched), including beating a time limit, not getting hit and not collecting any prizes.

As Kid Chameleon moves through the game's levels, he gains access to masks that alter him into different characters. Each character has different special abilities and varying numbers of hit points. Collecting a mask that the player is already wearing will restore its health. The sheer amount of variety in gameplay due to the various characters is part of what gives Kid Chameleon such an addictive style; few levels repeat the same structure and they usually have specific strategies and characters to be beaten. In addition to the offensive abilities of each form, the Kid can also defeat enemies by jumping on them, although he may take damage from some enemies by doing so. Each form can also make use of Diamond Powers that require diamonds collected in the game to use, accessed by pressing A + Start. Players lose a life if Kid Chameleon loses all his hit points in human form, is crushed, falls into bottomless pits or lava, touches the drill wall which appears in certain levels, or if time runs out. Extra lives and continues can be found in the game, with additional lives awarded for every 50,000 points.

Characters
Kid Chameleon, also known as Casey, is the protagonist and playable character of the game, who takes on numerous forms by collecting masks. Unlike most games, the default character has a(n) benefit/advantage over other characters. Being if the player cannot jump over a block, whilst on the edge of the block the player can grab onto it, and get on top of it.
Berserker, with a horned helmet, uses his horns as weapons to charge up, destroying enemies and blocks in his way.
Cyclone, with a winged helmet, is a superhero who can spin fast enough to turn into a cyclone in order to fly.
EyeClops, with a futuristic visor, has a ray beam which can reveal hidden blocks and can use a fatal beam to harm enemies.
Iron Knight, with a knight's helm, can climb walls and break through the ground. He also has an additional two hit points, due to the fact that this form is covered in armor.
Juggernaut, with a skull mask, rides in a tank and shoots skull bombs.
Maniaxe, with a hockey mask, has an unlimited supply of throwable axes.
Micromax, with a giant fly head, can cling to walls and is small enough to get to areas other forms cannot. Unlike most forms, Micromax has 2 downsides. He moves slower, and jumps lower.
Red Stealth, with a samurai's kabuto, is a very agile character, who wields a katana and can attack downward. Red stealth jumps further up than other transformations, along with having a quicker walk/run speed.
Skycutter, with a skating helmet, rides on a hoverboard and can flip gravity back and forth in order to fly around. Sky cutter is the quickest form in terms of movement. While in the form the player cannot stop movement either. Making it impossible to stay still.
Heady Metal is the primary antagonist and only boss enemy. He is an AI who escaped from the arcade game Wild Side and began capturing the kids who played it. Heady Metal is a giant disembodied head who can be defeated by jumping on him.

Reception

Mega placed the game at #35 in their Top Mega Drive Games of All Time. MegaTech magazine said it was let down by the lack of challenge. Sega Force magazine gave the game a review score of 82% praising the game’s graphics, game music and citing the game’s similarities to the Mario and Sonic games and stating “Great platform action, but only for fans of the genre.” Console XS gave Kid chameleon overall score of 89/100, they praised the game having constant variety because of the main characters ability to change persona. The four reviewers of Mega Play gave very positive reviews praising the gameplay calling it "very concise" and praised the levels, the powers ups, graphics and game music.  They felt Kid Chameleon was similar to other action games and one reviewer felt the game "get to be monotonous after a while." Manci Games praised the graphics, controls and the gameplay and praised the ability to swap abilities saying that feature separates the game from what it is inspired by.  The reviewer found Kid Chamelon being similar to Super Mario Bros and the only criticism the reviewer had is the game does not have a save or password system.

Legacy
The game is included in Sega Genesis Collection for the PlayStation 2 and PlayStation Portable. It was released for the Virtual Console in Japan on May 22, 2007; North America on May 28, 2007; and Europe on June 1, 2007. The game has also appeared in Sonic's Ultimate Genesis Collection for Xbox 360 and PlayStation 3.

In 1993, a Kid Chameleon comic strip ran from issues 7–12 in the Fleetway publication Sonic the Comic. Later in 1995, another strip from Issues 54-59 called "Back to UnReality!" was run.

References

External links

Kid Chameleon can be played for free in the browser on the Internet Archive

1992 video games
Platform games
Sega Genesis games
Sega Technical Institute games
Sega video games
Video games about video games
Video games developed in the United States
Virtual Console games
Shapeshifter characters in video games
Multiplayer and single-player video games